Podgora pri Dolskem ( or ) is a small settlement northeast of Dolsko in the Municipality of Dol pri Ljubljani in the eastern part of the Upper Carniola region of Slovenia.

Name
The name of the settlement was changed from Podgora to Podgora pri Dolskem in 1953.

References

External links

Podgora pri Dolskem on Geopedia

Populated places in the Municipality of Dol pri Ljubljani